Leandro Nicolás Díaz (born 6 June 1992) is an Argentine football forward. He currently plays for Estudiantes de La Plata

External links
 Argentine Primera statistics at Fútbol XXI  
 
 
 
 
 

1992 births
Living people
Argentine footballers
Argentine expatriate footballers
Association football forwards
Club Atlético Lanús footballers
Club Atlético Tigre footballers
Club Atlético Huracán footballers
Everton de Viña del Mar footballers
Atlético Tucumán footballers
Ferro Carril Oeste footballers
Club Atlético Sarmiento footballers
Atlético de Rafaela footballers
C.D. Veracruz footballers
Estudiantes de La Plata footballers
Chilean Primera División players
Argentine Primera División players
Liga MX players
Argentine expatriate sportspeople in Chile
Argentine expatriate sportspeople in Mexico
Expatriate footballers in Chile
Expatriate footballers in Mexico
Sportspeople from San Miguel de Tucumán